Thomas Murphy may refer to:

Government

Military
Thomas C. Murphy, American Civil War Medal of Honor recipient
Thomas J. Murphy (Medal of Honor), American Civil War Medal of Honor recipient
Thomas Murphy (Medal of Honor), American Civil War Medal of Honor recipient
Thomas Murphy (Medal of Honor, 1869), American Indian Wars Medal of Honor recipient
Thomas Murphy (VC) (1839–1900), Irish recipient of the Victoria Cross
Thomas E. Murphy (general), United States Air Force general

Politics
Tom Murphy (Georgia politician) (1924–2007), American politician from the U.S. state of Georgia
Tom Murphy (Newfoundland politician) (1937–2018), Newfoundland politician
Thomas Alexander Murphy (1885–1966), politician in Ontario, Canada
Thomas Gerow Murphy (1883–1971), Canadian politician
Thomas J. Murphy (politician) (1861–1933), Newfoundland lawyer and politician
Thomas J. Murphy Jr. (born 1944), Democratic politician from Pittsburgh, Pennsylvania
Thomas Murphy (Collector) (1821–1901), Collector of the Port of New York, 1870–1871
Thomas Murphy (Australian politician) (1906–1978), member of the New South Wales Legislative Assembly
Thomas Murphy (Irish republican) (born 1949), reported former Chief of Staff of the Provisional IRA paramilitary group
Thomas W. Murphy Jr. (born 1942), American politician from the U.S. state of Maine

Other government
Thomas W. Murphy (American Samoa judge) (1935–1992), Associate Chief Justice of the High Court of American Samoa
Thomas W. Murphy (Illinois judge) (born 1953), U.S. District Court Judge in Chicago
Thomas Francis Murphy (1905–1995), American judge in New York City

Media and arts
Tom Murphy (artist) (born 1949), English artist
Tom Murphy (actor) (1968–2007), Irish theatre and film actor
Tom Murphy (playwright) (1935–2018), Irish dramatist
Tommy Murphy (Australian playwright) (born 1979), Australian playwright
Thomas Murphy (broadcasting) (1925–2022), American broadcast executive
Thomas F. Murphy (author) (born 1939), American author

Sports

Australian rules football
Tommy Murphy (Australian footballer) (1903–1958), Australian rules footballer for South Melbourne
Tom Murphy (footballer, born 1986), Australian rules footballer for Hawthorn and the Gold Coast
Tom Murphy (footballer, born 1998), Australian rules footballer for North Melbourne

Baseball
Tom Murphy (pitcher) (born 1945), American Major League Baseball pitcher
Tommy Murphy (baseball) (born 1979), American Major League Baseball outfielder
Tom Murphy (catcher) (born 1991), American Major League Baseball catcher

Other sports
Torpedo Billy Murphy (Thomas William Murphy, 1863–1939), boxer from New Zealand
Tom Murphy (American football) (1901–1994), American NFL football player
Tom Murphy (Irish footballer) (fl. 1920s), Irish international footballer
Tommy Murphy (Gaelic footballer) (1921–1985), Irish Gaelic footballer for County Laois
Tom Murphy (runner) (born 1935), American middle-distance runner
Tommy Murphy (hurler) (born 1943), Irish hurler
Tom Murphy (chess player) (born 1957), American chess player
Tommy Murphy (snooker player) (born 1962), Northern Irish snooker player
Tom Murphy (fighter) (born 1974), American mixed martial artist
Tom Murphy (English footballer) (born 1991), English footballer for Farnborough

Others
Thomas Murphy (chairman) (1915–2006), former CEO of General Motors
Thomas Joseph Murphy (1932–1997), American bishop in the Catholic Church
Thomas Austin Murphy (1911–1981), American clergyman of the Roman Catholic Church
Thomas W. Murphy (anthropologist) (born 1967), Environmental Anthropologist and Latter Day Saint writer
Tom Murphy (physicist), astrophysicist
Thomas E. Murphy (educator) (1856–1933), American educator
Thomas Murphy (pediatrician), American pediatrician
Tom Murphy VII (born 1979), computer programmer and YouTuber